RC Písek is a Czech rugby club based in Písek. They currently do not play in a league.

History
The club was founded in 2008 by three employees of Schneider Electric in the town, Emmanuel Boyer, Bastien Loiseaux and Lenka Hauptmanova.

In 2008 the club participated in its first tournament, sponsored by Schneider Electric in Metz, France.

External links
RC Písek

Czech rugby union teams
Rugby clubs established in 2008